Kopsiopsis is a small genus of flowering plants in the family Orobanchaceae native to North America.

Species
, Kew's Plants of the World Online accepts 2 species in the genus Kopsiopsis:

Kopsiopsis hookeri  – Vancouver groundcone
Kopsiopsis strobilacea  – California groundcone

References

Orobanchaceae
Orobanchaceae genera